Phymorhynchus wareni is a species of sea snail, a marine gastropod mollusk in the family Raphitomidae.

This species has been described from hydrothermal vents in 1995.

Description

Distribution

References

External links
 

wareni
Gastropods described in 1995